Dudleya multicaulis is a succulent plant known by the common name manystem liveforever or many-stemmed dudleya. This Dudleya is endemic to southern California, where it is rare and seriously threatened as its habitat is altered by humans. Many occurrences of this species have been extirpated. This species is characterized by a few short, fingerlike cylindrical leaves with pointed tips, and its erect peduncle, which is topped with a branching inflorescence bearing up to 15 flowers on each long, thin branch. The flowers, which appear in late spring, have pointed yellow petals and long stamens. It is usually found on heavy clay or rocky soils and outcrops.

Description

Morphology 
Dudleya multicaulis is thought to represent the most basal member of the Dudleya subgenus Hasseanthus, which are characterized by paedomorphic adaptations including vernal foliage and an underground, tuberous caudex also seen in Dudleya seedlings. The caudex has been reduced to a subterranean structure roughly equivalent to a corm. The 5 to 15 green leaves are summer deciduous, with their surfaces not or somewhat glaucous. The leaves are shaped cylindric and linear except at the base, with the bases flushing with purple-red when the leaves are detached or damaged at that point.

There are 7 to 18 strongly ascending bracts, with a similar linear shape to the rosette leaves. The inflorescence may first branch 2 or more times, and then subsequently rebranch 0 to 1 more times.

The flowers are odorless. The apex of the petals is acute. The corolla measures  in diameter. Flowering is in late spring from May to June.

Distribution and habitat
Dudleya multicaulis is endemic to the Los Angeles coastal plain and the adjacent hills, parts of the Transverse and Peninsular ranges, and south towards northern San Diego County. It is distributed in Orange, Los Angeles, Riverside, and San Diego counties, and historically, San Bernardino County. There are 31 extant occurrences of this species, 41 occurrences of unknown status, and at least 31 or more extirpated occurrences. D. multicaulis is primarily found on heavy soils, usually clay, rocky hillsides, and sandstone outcrops. Because of the urbanization of habitat, the species is declining.

Gallery

References

External links
Jepson Manual Treatment - Dudleya multicaulis
USDA Plants Profile
Dudleya multicaulis - Photo gallery

multicaulis
Endemic flora of California
Natural history of the California chaparral and woodlands
Natural history of Orange County, California
Natural history of the Peninsular Ranges
Natural history of the Transverse Ranges
Taxa named by Reid Venable Moran